The 2007 Davis Cup was the 96th edition of the Davis Cup, a national teams competition in men's tennis. Sixteen teams participated in the World Group and 123 took part in different regional groups. The final took place 30 November - 2 December at the Memorial Coliseum in Portland, Oregon, United States, with the United States defeating Russia 4-1 for their 32nd title.

World Group

Draw

First round losers play in World Group play-offs.

Final

World Group play-offs

Date: 21–23 September
The 8 losing teams in the World Group first round ties, and 8 winners of the Group I second round ties entered the draw for the World Group Playoffs. 8 seeded teams, based on the latest Davis Cup ranking, were drawn against 8 unseeded teams.

 ,  and  will remain in Zonal Group I in 2008.

1 Took place on September 20, 21 and 23, due to Yom Kippur taking place on the 22nd.

Americas Zone

Group I

Participating Teams
  — advanced to World Group play-offs
 
 
 
  — advanced to World Group play-offs
  — relegated to Group II in 2008

Group II
Participating Teams
  — relegated to Group III in 2008
 
 
 
  — relegated to Group III in 2008
 
 
  — promoted to Group I in 2008

Group III
Participating Teams
  — promoted to Group II in 2008
 
  — promoted to Group II in 2008
  — relegated to Group IV in 2008
 
  — relegated to Group IV in 2008

Group IV
Participating Teams
  — promoted to Group III in 2008
  — promoted to Group III in 2008
 
 
  (withdrawn)
  Eastern Caribbean (withdrawn)
  (withdrawn)

Asia/Oceania Zone

Group I
Participating Teams
  — relegated to Group II in 2008
 
 
  — advanced to World Group play-offs
 
  — advanced to World Group play-offs

Group II
Participating Teams
 
 
  — relegated to Group III in 2008
 
 
  Pacific Oceania
  — relegated to Group III in 2008
  — promoted to Group I in 2008

Group III
Participating Teams
  — promoted to Group II in 2008
 
  — promoted to Group II in 2008
  — relegated to Group IV in 2008
  — relegated to Group IV in 2008

Group IV
Participating Teams
 
 
 
 
 
 
 
  — promoted to Group III in 2008
  — promoted to Group III in 2008

Europe/Africa Zone

Group I
Participating Teams
 
  — advanced to World Group play-offs
  — advanced to World Group play-offs
 
  — relegated to Group II in 2008
 
 
  — relegated to Group II in 2008
  — advanced to World Group play-offs
  — advanced to World Group play-offs

Group II
Participating Teams
 
  — relegated to Group III in 2008
 
 
  — relegated to Group III in 2008
 
 
 
  - promoted to Group I in 2008
 
 
  — relegated to Group III in 2008
  — relegated to Group III in 2008
  - promoted to Group I in 2008

Group III

Venue 1
Participating Teams
 
  — promoted to Group II in 2008
  — relegated to Group IV in 2008
  — promoted to Group II in 2008
 
 
  — relegated to Group IV in 2008

Venue 2
Participating Teams
 
 
 
  — relegated to Group IV in 2008
  — relegated to Group IV in 2008
  — promoted to Group II in 2008
  — promoted to Group II in 2008

Group IV
Participating Teams
  — promoted to Group III in 2008
  — promoted to Group III in 2008
  — promoted to Group III in 2008
  — promoted to Group III in 2008
 
  (withdrawn)
  (withdrawn)
  (withdrawn)
  (withdrawn)
  (withdrawn)
  (withdrawn)

References

External links 

 

 
Davis Cup
Davis Cups by year
Sports in Portland, Oregon